The Norwegian Nobel Committee selects the recipients of the Nobel Peace Prize each year on behalf of Swedish industrialist Alfred Nobel's estate, based on instructions of Nobel's will.

Five members are appointed by the Norwegian Parliament. In his will, Alfred Nobel tasked the parliament of Norway with selecting the winners of the Nobel Peace Prize. At the time, Norway and Sweden were in a loose personal union. Despite its members being appointed by Parliament, the committee is a private body tasked with awarding a private prize. In recent decades, most committee members were retired politicians.

The committee is assisted by its secretariat, Norwegian Nobel Institute. The committee holds their meetings in the institute's building, where the winner is also announced. Since 1990, however, the award ceremony takes place in Oslo City Hall.

History

Alfred Nobel died in December 1896. In January 1897 the contents of his will were unveiled. It was written as early as in 1895. He declared that a Nobel Peace Prize should be awarded "to the person who shall have done the most or the best work for fraternity between nations, for the abolition or reduction of standing armies and for the holding and promotion of peace congresses", and that some of Nobel's money was to be donated to this prize. The Nobel Foundation manages the assets. The other Nobel Prizes were to be awarded by Swedish bodies (Swedish Academy, Royal Swedish Academy of Sciences, Karolinska Institutet) that already existed, whereas the responsibility for the Peace Prize was given to the Norwegian Parliament, specifically "a committee of five persons to be elected" by it. A new body had to be created—the Norwegian Nobel Committee.

Jurist Fredrik Heffermehl has noted that a legislative body could not necessarily be expected to handle a judicial task like managing a legal will. The task of a parliament is to create and change laws whereas a will can not be changed unless the premises are clearly outdated. However, this question was not debated in depth, out of contemporary fear that the donated money might be lost in legal battles if the body was not created soon. On 26 April 1897 the Norwegian Parliament accepted the assignment and on 5 August the same year it formalized the process of election and service time for committee members. The first Peace Prize was awarded in 1901 to Henri Dunant and Frédéric Passy. In the beginning, the committee was filled with active parliamentarians and the annual reports were discussed in parliamentary sessions. These ties to the Norwegian Parliament were later weakened so that the  committee became more independent. Accordingly, the name was changed from the Norwegian Nobel Committee to the Nobel Committee of the Norwegian Parliament in 1901, but changed back in 1977. Now, active parliamentarians cannot sit on the committee, unless they have explicitly stated their intent to step down shortly.

Nonetheless, the committee is still composed mainly of politicians. A 1903 proposition to elect a law scholar (Ebbe Hertzberg) was rejected. In late 1948, the election system was changed to make the committee more proportional with parliamentary representation of Norwegian political parties. The Norwegian Labour Party, which controlled a simple majority of seats in the Norwegian Parliament orchestrated this change. This practice has been cemented, but sharply criticized. There have been propositions about including non-Norwegian members in the committee, but this has never happened.

The Norwegian Nobel Committee is assisted by the Norwegian Nobel Institute, established in 1904. The committee might receive well more than a hundred nominations and asks the Nobel Institute in February every year to research about twenty candidates. The director of the Nobel Institute also serves as secretary to the Norwegian Nobel Committee; currently this position belongs to Olav Njølstad.

List of Chairpersons
List of chairpersons

1900–1901: Bernhard Getz
1901–1922: Jørgen Løvland
1922–1922: Hans Jacob Horst
1922–1941: Fredrik Stang
1941–1943: Gunnar Jahn
1944–1945: see below
1945–1945: Carl Joachim Hambro
1945–1966: Gunnar Jahn
1967–1967: Nils Langhelle
1967–1967: Bernt Ingvaldsen

1968–1978: Aase Lionæs
1979–1981: John Sanness
1982–1989: Egil Aarvik
1990–1990: Gidske Anderson
1991–1999: Francis Sejersted
2000–2002: Gunnar Berge
2003–2008: Ole Danbolt Mjøs
2009–2015: Thorbjørn Jagland
2015–2017: Kaci Kullmann Five
2017–present: Berit Reiss-Andersen

In January 1944 an attempt by the Quisling government to take over the functions of the Nobel Committee  led to the resignation of Jahn and other committee members. The Swedish consulate-general in Oslo formally took over the management of the Foundation's Oslo property on behalf of the Nobel Foundation.

Members

The members  are:

Berit Reiss-Andersen (chair, born 1954), advocate (barrister) and president of the Norwegian Bar Association, former state secretary for the Minister of Justice and the Police (representing the Labour Party). Member of the Norwegian Nobel Committee since 2012, reappointed for the period 2018–2023.
Anne Enger (born 1949), former Leader of the Centre Party and Minister of Culture. Appointed for the period 2018–2020, and reappointed for the period 2021–2026.
Asle Toje (born 1974), foreign policy scholar. Appointed for the period 2018–2023.
Kristin Clemet, former Conservative Party cabinet member who previously represented Oslo in Norwegian Parliament. Appointed for the period 2021–2026.
Jørgen Watne Frydnes, appointed for the period 2021–2026.

Secretariat

The committee is assisted by the Norwegian Nobel Institute, its secretariat. The leader of the institute holds the title secretary. The secretary is not a member of the committee, but is an employee of the Norwegian Nobel Institute.

List of secretaries
1901–1909: Christian Lous Lange
1910–1945: Ragnvald Moe
1946–1973: August Schou
1974–1977: Tim Greve
1978–1989: Jakob Sverdrup
1990–2015: Geir Lundestad
2015–present: Olav Njølstad

References
Notes

Bibliography

Heffermehl, Fredrik (2010). The Nobel Peace Prize. What Nobel really wanted'. Sta Barbara: Praeger. .

External links

Norwegian Nobel Committee – official site
Nobel Prize – official site

Organisations based in Oslo
Organizations established in 1901
1901 establishments in Norway
Nobel Peace Prize